Anemone halleri, Haller's anemone, is a species of flowering plant in the buttercup family Ranunculaceae, that can be found in sub-alpine and alpine regions of southern France, southern Switzerland, northern Italy and Poland, extending eastward to Greece, Bulgaria and Ukraine. It is found in mountain meadows, dry hills, dry grassy locations and mountainous forest glades. It is collected and cultivated for botanical and private gardens.

It prefers an exposed, well-drained position in full sun.
 

Anemone halleri is mildly toxic, and can cause stomach ache on skin contact.

It is still widely referenced under its former name, Pulsatilla halleri. The species  and the subspecies P. halleri subsp. slavica are recipients of the Royal Horticultural Society's Award of Garden Merit.

References

halleri
Taxa named by Carlo Allioni